Tonello is an Italian surname. Notable bearers include:

 Alfred Tonello, French cyclist
 Fabrizio Tonello, Italian scientist
 Michael Tonello, American journalist
 Raffael Tonello, Italian football player

See also

 Tonelli

Italian-language surnames
Patronymic surnames